Mads Christensen may refer to:

Mads Christensen (pastor) (1856–1929), New Zealand Lutheran pastor born in Denmark
Mads Christensen (cyclist) (born 1984), Danish road and former track cyclist, currently riding for Team CULT Energy
Mads Christensen (ice hockey, born 1984), Danish ice hockey defenceman
Mads Christensen (ice hockey, born 1987), Danish ice hockey forward
Mads Christensen (comedian) (born 1965), Danish comedian, author and public speaker
Mads Emil Christensen (born 1997), Danish badminton player
Mads Græsbøll Christensen (born 1977), Danish professor in audio processing